The Great Andamanese languages are a nearly extinct language family once spoken by the Great Andamanese peoples of the Andaman Islands in the Indian Ocean.

History 
By the late 18th century, when the British first established a colonial presence on the Andaman islands, there were an estimated 5,000 Great Andamanese living on Great Andaman and surrounding islands, comprising 10 distinct tribes with distinct but closely related languages. From the 1860s onwards, the  British established a penal colony on the islands, which led to the subsequent arrival of mainland settlers and indentured labourers, mainly from the Indian subcontinent. This coincided with the massive population reduction of the Andamanese due to outside diseases, to a low of 19 individuals in 1961.

Since then their numbers have rebounded somewhat, reaching 52 by 2010.  However, by 1994 there were no remembers of any but the northern lects, and divisions among the surviving tribes (Jeru, Kora, Bo and Cari) had effectively ceased to exist due to intermarriage and resettlement to a much smaller territory on Strait Island. Some of them also intermarried with Karen (Burmese) and Indian settlers. Hindi serves as their primary language. 
Some of the population spoke a koine based mainly on Aka-Jeru, but even this is only partially remembered and no longer a language of daily use.

Aka-Kora became fully extinct in November 2009, when its last rememberer, Boro Sr, died.
The last semi-fluent speaker of the koine, Nao Jr., also died in 2009. 
The last rememberer of Aka-Bo died in 2010 at age 85.<ref name=telegraph2>(2011) Lives Remembered.  The Daily Telegraph, London, 10 February 2010. Accessed on 2010-02-22. Also on web.archive.org</ref> The last rememberer of Aka-Cari, a woman called Licho, died from chronic tuberculosis in April 2020 in Shadipur, Port Blair.Mourning the death of a language amid the pandemic, Straits Times, 2020 June 3
As of reports published in 2020, there remained three heritage-speakers of Aka-Jeru.

Grammar
The Great Andamanese languages are agglutinative languages, with an extensive prefix and suffix system.Temple, Richard C. (1902). A Grammar of the Andamanese Languages, being Chapter IV of Part I of the Census Report on the Andaman and Nicobar Islands. Superintendent's Printing Press: Port Blair.  They have a distinctive noun class system based largely on body parts, in which every noun and adjective may take a prefix according to which body part it is associated with (on the basis of shape, or functional association). Thus, for instance, the *aka- at the beginning of the language names is a prefix for objects related to the tongue.  An adjectival example can be given by the various forms of yop, "pliable, soft", in Aka-Bea: 
A cushion or sponge is ot-yop "round-soft", from the prefix attached to words relating to the head or heart.
A cane is ôto-yop, "pliable", from a prefix for long things.
A stick or pencil is aka-yop, "pointed", from the tongue prefix.
A fallen tree is ar-yop, "rotten", from the prefix for limbs or upright things.
Similarly, beri-nga "good" yields:un-bēri-ŋa "clever" (hand-good).ig-bēri-ŋa "sharp-sighted" (eye-good).aka-bēri-ŋa "good at languages" (tongue-good).ot-bēri-ŋa "virtuous" (head/heart-good).

The prefixes are:

Abbi (2013: 80) lists the following body part prefixes in Great Andamanese.

Body parts are inalienably possessed, requiring a possessive adjective prefix to complete them, so one cannot say "head" alone, but only "my, or his, or your, etc. head".

The basic pronouns are almost identical throughout the Great Andamanese languages; Aka-Bea will serve as a representative example (pronouns given in their basic prefixal forms):

'This' and 'that' are distinguished as k- and t-.

Judging from the available sources, the Andamanese languages have only two cardinal numbers — one and two — and their entire numerical lexicon is one, two, one more, some more, and all.

Phonology

The following is the sound system of the present-day Great Andamanese (PGA):

It is noted that a few sounds would have changed among more recent speakers, perhaps due to the influence of Hindi. Older speakers tended to have different pronunciations than among the more younger speakers. The consonant sounds of /pʰ, kʰ, l/ were common among older speakers to pronounce them as [ɸ~f~β, x, lʷ]. The lateral /l/ sound may have also been pronounced as [ʎ]. Sounds such as a labio-velar approximant /w/, only occur within words or can be a word-final, and cannot occur as a word-initial consonant. The sounds [ɽ, β] can occur as allophones of /r, b/.

Classification
The languages spoken in the Andaman islands fall into two clear families, Great Andamanese and Ongan, plus one unattested language, Sentinelese. These are generally seen as related. However, the similarities between Great Andamanese and Ongan are so far mainly of a typological morphological nature, with little demonstrated common vocabulary. As a result, even long-range researchers such as Joseph Greenberg have expressed doubts as to the validity of Andamanese as a family, and Abbi (2008) considers the surviving Great Andamanese language to be an isolate.  The Great Andaman languages are:

Great Andamanese
Southern
Aka-Bea or Bea (†)
Akar-Bale or Bale (†)
Central
Aka-Kede or Kede (†)
Aka-Kol or Kol (†)
Oko-Juwoi or Juwoi (†)
A-Pucikwar or Pucikwar (†)
Northern
Aka-Cari or Chari (†)
Aka-Kora or Kora (†)
Aka-Jeru or Jeru
Aka-Bo or Bo (†)

Joseph Greenberg proposed that Great Andamanese is related to western Papuan languages as members of a larger phylum he called Indo-Pacific, but this is not generally accepted by other linguists. Stephen Wurm states that the lexical similarities between Great Andamanese and the West Papuan and certain languages of Timor "are quite striking and amount to virtual formal identity [...] in a number of instances", but considers this to be due to a linguistic substratum rather than a direct relationship.

Names and spellings, with populations, from the 1901 and 1994 censuses were as follows:

1901 census
Aka-Cari: 39
Aka-Cora: 96
Aka-Bo: 48
Aka-Jeru: 218
Aka-Kede: 59
Aka-Koi: 11
Oka-Juwoi: 48
Aka-Pucikwar: 50
Aka-Bale: 19
Aka-Bea: 37

1994 census
Aka-Jeru: 19
Aka-Bo: 15
Aka-Kari: 2
('local': 4)

Samples

The following poem in Aka-Bea was written by a chief, Jambu, after he was freed from a six-month jail term for manslaughter.

 ngô:do kûk l'àrtâ:lagî:ka, mō:ro el:ma kâ igbâ:dàla mō:ro el:mo lê aden:yarà pō:-tōt läh. Chorus: aden:yarà pō:-tōt läh.Literally:

 thou heart-sad art,
 sky-surface to there looking while,
 sky-surface of ripple to looking while,
 bamboo spear on lean-dost.

Translation:

 Thou art sad at heart,
 gazing there at the sky's surface,
 gazing at the ripple on the sky's surface,
 leaning on the bamboo spear.

Note, however, that, as seems to be typical of Andamanese poetry, the words and sentence structure have been somewhat abbreviated or inverted in order to obtain the desired rhythmical effect.

As another example, we give part of a creation myth in Oko-Juwoi, reminiscent of Prometheus:

 References 

Bibliography
 Yadav, Yogendra. 1985. "Great Andamanese: a preliminary study." Pacific Linguistics, Series A, No. 67: 185-214. Canberra: The Australian National University.
Abbi, Anvita. 2011. Dictionary of the Great Andamanese language. Port Blair: Ratna Sagar.
Abbi, Anvita. 2013. A Grammar of the Great Andamanese Language''. Brill's Studies in South and Southwest Asian Languages, Volume 4.

External links
Jero in IPA transcription
Burenhult's Paper on Andamanese

 
Agglutinative languages
 
Languages of India
Endangered languages of India
Great Andamanese